Skin Dive is a jazz vocal album by Michael Franks, released in 1985 with Warner Bros. Records. It was Franks' ninth studio album, and the first he co-produced himself. The single off this album, "Your Secret's Safe With Me", is his biggest Adult Contemporary hit, peaking at #4.

Track listing

Personnel

Musicians
Michael Franks - vocals
Brenda Russell - vocals on "When I Give My Love to You"
Joe Caro (6), Vivian Cherry (1, 2, 4), Kacey Cisyk (8), Bobby Floyd (2, 4), Frank Floyd (1), Leslie Miller (2, 4), Rob Mounsey (2-4, 6, 8), Will Lee (3, 6) - backing vocals
Ron Carter (9), Mark Egan (8), Neil Jason (3), Marcus Miller (1), Will Lee (2, 6) - bass guitar
Danny Gottlieb (7) - cymbals
Steve Gadd (9), Andy Newmark (8), Danny Gottlieb (7), Chris Parker (3) - drums
Jeff Mironov (7) - electric and acoustic guitar
Dave Bargeron (9) - Euphonium
Jon Faddis (9) - flugelhorn
Bill Evans (8) - flute
Lawrence Feldman, George Young (9) - alto flute
Peter Gordon (9) - French horn
Jeff Mironov (8), Hiram Bullock (1, 6), Hugh McCracken (2) - guitar
Steve Khan (3) - guitar solo
Rob Mounsey - keyboards, programming, arrangements, Yamaha DX7 on "Please Don't Say Goodnight"
Manolo Badrena (8), Sue Evans (8) - percussion
Warren Bernhardt (9), Clifford Carter (3) - piano
Chris Parker (1, 2, 4-6, 8) - Simmons drums
David Sanborn (7) - alto saxophone
Ronnie Cuber (9) - baritone saxophone
Michael Brecker (9) - tenor saxophone

References

Bibliography

Michael Franks (musician) albums
1985 albums
Warner Records albums
Albums produced by Rob Mounsey